Herbert Hunger (9 December 1914 – 9 July 2000) was an Austrian Byzantinist.

Hunger was born and died in Vienna.  From 1973 to 1982 he served two consecutive terms as president of the Austrian Academy of Sciences.

Literary works 
 Lexikon der griechischen und römischen Mythologie (Lexicon of Greek and Roman Mythology), 1953, (8th edition 1988)
 Reich der Neuen Mitte, 1965
 Byzantinische Grundlagenforschung, 1973
 Die hochsprachliche profane Literatur der Byzantiner, 2 Vols., 1978
 Schreiben und Lesen in Byzanz: Die byzantinische Buchkultur, 1989
 Das Denken am Leitseil der Sprache, 1999

Decorations and awards
 Grand Commander of the Order of the Phoenix (Greece)
 Grand Cross of Merit with Star of the Order of Merit of the Federal Republic of Germany
 1968: Wilhelm Hartel Prize
 1979: City of Vienna Prize for Humanities
 1980: elected to the American Philosophical Society
 1981: Austrian Decoration for Science and Art
 Grand Gold Decoration for Services to the Republic of Austria
 Grand Gold Decoration for Services to the City of Vienna

References

External links 
 Obituary by Johannes Koder, his student and friend (in German)
 Short biography with picture
 Obituary at Byzantium (Society for the Promotion of Byzantine Studies) - please scroll down to 2001 obituaries
 Austrian Academy of Sciences
 Review of 'Festschrift' outlining the history of the Byzantine Institute of the University of Vienna, founded by Herbert Hunger

1914 births
2000 deaths
20th-century Austrian historians
Austrian philologists
Historical linguists
Austrian Byzantinists
Scholars of Medieval Greek
Writers from Vienna
Knights Commander of the Order of Merit of the Federal Republic of Germany
Grand Commanders of the Order of the Phoenix (Greece)
Recipients of the Austrian Decoration for Science and Art
Recipients of the Grand Decoration for Services to the Republic of Austria
Austrian medievalists
20th-century philologists
Scholars of Byzantine literature
Corresponding Fellows of the British Academy

Members of the American Philosophical Society